This is a list of musicians who have performed on officially released Frank Zappa recordings. Note that this list does not include musicians who have performed as guest musicians at Frank Zappa concerts unless they appear on official live recordings. Additionally, this list does not include musicians who have only appeared on bootleg recordings.

A

B

C

D

E

F

G

H

I

J

K

L

M

N

O

P

R

S

T

U

V

W

Y

Z

References

External links
Frank Zappa
Frank Zappa discography
 FZ Muzishnins' & Corobberatrums
 The Official Frank Zappa Site

Frank Zappa